Jack Bonnell Dennis (born October 13, 1931) is a computer scientist and Emeritus Professor of Computer Science and Engineering at Massachusetts Institute of Technology.

The work of Dennis in computer systems and computer languages is recognized to have played a key role in hacker culture. As a Massachusetts Institute of Technology faculty member he sponsored easier access to computer facilities at MIT during the early development of the subculture.  Much of what would later become Unix came from his early collaboration with Dennis Ritchie and Ken Thompson. This collaborative and open philosophy lives on today.

Dennis was also a member of the historic Tech Model Railroad Club,  which incubated much of the early slang and traditions of hacking.

Early life and education
Dennis graduated from the Massachusetts Institute of Technology (MIT) as Bachelor of Science (1953), Master of Science (1954), and Doctor of Science (1958). His doctoral thesis analyzed the relation between mathematical programming problems and electrical networks. After completing his doctorate, Dennis became part of the MIT's Department of Electrical Engineering and Computer Science's faculty, being promoted to full professor in 1969.

Career
As a professor at MIT, Dennis was influential in the work of students Alan Kotok, fellow professors Marvin Minsky and John McCarthy. He gave young programmers access to multi-million dollar computers and allowed them to see where their abilities could take them, inspiring a generation of MIT graduates who would shape the computer industry at DEC, Xerox Parc and ARPA.

Dennis was one of the founders of the Multics project. His most important contribution to the project was the concept of the single-level memory. Multics was not fully successful as a commercial project, but it was important because it influenced the design of many other computer operating systems, most importantly the direct inspiration for Ken Thompson (who also worked on the project) to design the first incarnation of Unix. In recognition of his work on the Multics project, Dennis was elected as IEEE Fellow.

Dennis' research at the MIT focused in Computer Theory and Computer Systems, specifically:

 Theoretical Models for Computation
 Computation Structures
 Structure of Computer Systems
 Semantic Theory for Computer Systems
 Semantics of Parallel Computation
 Computer System Architecture

Dennis has also worked as an independent consultant and research scientist on projects related with parallel computer hardware and software since his retirement from MIT in 1987. He has worked with the NASA Research Institute for Advanced Computer Science as visiting scientist, with the Architecture Group of Carlstedt Elektronik (Gothenburg, Sweden), and with Acorn Networks, Inc., as Chief Scientist.

A great part of Dennis' career has been devoted to non-von Neumann models of computation, architecture, and languages, where programs are not attached to a program counter. Along with his students, Dennis adopted the concepts of single assignment and dataflow, in which instructions are executed as soon as data are available (this specific model is called "static" in contrast to Arvind's "dynamic").

In 2009, Dennis was elected a member of the National Academy of Engineering for contributions to sharing and protection in computer systems and parallel architectures based on data flow principles.

Awards and recognitions
 IEEE John von Neumann Medal, 2013
 Association for Computing Machinery (ACM) Special Interest Group on Operating Systems (SIGOPS) Hall of Fame, 2012
 Member of the National Academy of Engineering (NAE), 2009
 Eckert-Mauchly Award, 1984
 IEEE Fellow
 ACM Fellow

References

External links
 Jack B. Dennis home page
 Biography
 Photograph of Jack B. Dennis
 Oral history interview with Jack B. Dennis at the Charles Babbage Institute, University of Minnesota.  Dennis describes his educational background and work in time-sharing computer systems at the Massachusetts Institute of Technology (MIT), including the TX-0 computer, the work of John McCarthy on time-sharing, and the influence of the Information Processing Techniques Office of the Advanced Research Projects Agency. Dennis also recalls the competition between Digital Equipment Corporation, General Electric, Burroughs, and International Business Machines, to manufacture time-sharing systems. He describes the development of MULTICS at General Electric.
 Toward the Computer Utility: A Career in Computer System Architecture — Jack B. Dennis
 Parallel Computing Pioneers — Jack B. Dennis

American computer scientists
American electrical engineers
Fellows of the Association for Computing Machinery
Living people
MIT School of Engineering alumni
MIT School of Engineering faculty
Members of the United States National Academy of Engineering
Multics people
1931 births